West Montlake Park is a park in the Montlake neighborhood of Seattle, Washington. The park is bounded on the north by the Montlake Cut, on the west by Portage Bay, on the south by the Seattle Yacht Club marina, and on the east by West Park Drive E. It is connected to East Montlake Park by the 1971 Montlake Cut Waterside Trail, which runs along the cut and passes under the Montlake Bridge.

The park was acquired by the city in 1909.

External links
West Montlake Park history

Parks in Seattle
Montlake, Seattle